Beardmore-Halford-Pullinger (BHP) were a series of aircraft engines used in production between 1916 and 1918. The engines were used on many notable First World War aircraft, such as the Airco DH.4, DH.9, Airco DH.10 Amiens, de Havilland DH.15 and Avro 529 aircraft.

The engines were used as the basis for later designs such as the Siddeley Puma and A.D.C Nimbus (1926).

Formation
The name is derived from surnames of three people:
Sir William Beardmore of William Beardmore and Company: Responsible for funding and providing original engines from his production company, which manufactured aero engines used in many aircraft prior to 1916 such as the 120 hp, 160 hp and Beardmore Tornado (diesel). They also manufactured aircraft and airships, such as the Beardmore W.B.III, and R23X class airship. The company types were modified into the B.H.P. engines.
Frank Halford: Responsible for proposing modifications to the engines originally taken from Beardmore designs. Brevet captain Halford worked for the Air Inspection Directorate (AID) at Farnborough. He later designed the first turbocharged racing car engine, the Halford Special, all the engines made by de Havilland including jets and rockets, and several engines for D. Napier & Son, including the Sabre.
 Thomas Pullinger: Halford's proposals were made a working proposition by engineer and managing director of the Arrol-Johnston car factory T C Pullinger. Arrol-Johnston had manufactured the Austro-Daimler as the 160 hp Beardmore aero-engine. Arrol-Johnston's works was at Heathhall in Dumfries and continued development and production of aero engines such as the B.H.P. The B.H.P. was handed over to the Siddeley Motor Company and their version which had further improvements became well known as The Puma. Galloway Engineering was a subsidiary of Arrol-Johnston. Pullinger continued production of the B.H.P. post-war as the Galloway Adriatic.

The BHP engines
The first BHP engine was a modified Beardmore 120 hp, itself a licensed copy of the Austro-Daimler 6. Changes made for the BHP included twin carburettors and dual ignition. These increased its output to 160 hp.

Halford and Pullinger then designed a completely new engine which delivered 230 hp. A new company, the Galloway Engineering Co. Ltd. was set up in Dumfries to continue development and production of the engine. It was sold as the Adriatic.

Endurance tests began in June 1916 in a DH.4, said to have been modified by Geoffrey de Havilland and tested by the Central Flying School.

The engine was also licensed to Siddeley-Deasy, to be built at their Parkside works. John Siddeley himself worked on the engine and would later, after additions to the watercooling system, release an improved 240 hp version as the Siddeley Puma.

Motor Co. Ltd. Coventry, Siddeley-Deasy and the Arrol Johnston factory were eventually called upon to assist production as Galloway Engineering could not produce enough units per week, after which they were left with just making the steel engine blocks.

V12 derivatiives
 Galloway BHP Atlantic. Two cylinder blocks from the Galloway BHP were combined on a single crank shaft to create the V12 configuration Atlantic, delivering 500 hp.
 Galloway BHP Pacific. The Pacific was an Atlantic fitted with Puma cylinder blocks.
 Airdisco Nimbus.

See also

References

External links
 Formation of the company described in litigation

Defunct aircraft engine manufacturers of the United Kingdom
Engineering companies of Scotland